New Moscow or "Greater Moscow" (not to be confused with the 1925 Greater Moscow) are the territories annexed to Moscow in 2012 in the course of the largest project to expand the territory of Moscow in the entire history of the administrative-territorial division of the city. The main goals of the project are to dismantle the traditional monocentric structure of the Moscow agglomeration, as well as streamline urban zoning, giving the newly annexed territories a distinct administrative and governmental specialization.

Politics 
New Moscow is a part of the New Moscow constituency of the State Duma, as well as the 38th and 39th constituencies of the Moscow City Duma.

References

21st century in Moscow
Politics of Moscow
Populated places in Moscow (federal city)